

The Piper PT-1 was a 1940s American two-seat primary training monoplane designed and built by Piper Aircraft at Lock Haven. A low-wing tandem two-seat monoplane, the PT-1 was the first Piper aircraft to have a low-wing. It had a fabric covering over an all-metal fuselage frame and wooden spar wings and tail unit. The PT-1 had a retractable tailwheel landing gear and was powered by a  Franklin 6AC-2980D engine. No further aircraft were built. A four-seat development was designed as the Piper PWA-6 which did not go into production either.

Specifications (PT-1)

See also

References

Bibliography
 

1940s United States civil trainer aircraft
PT-1
Abandoned civil aircraft projects of the United States
Single-engined tractor aircraft
Low-wing aircraft
Aircraft first flown in 1942